Rumeli Anup Dhar (born 9 December 1983) is an Indian former cricketer who played as an all-rounder, batting right-handed and bowling right-arm medium. She appeared in four Test matches, 78 One Day Internationals and 18 Twenty20 Internationals for India between 2003 and 2018. She played domestic cricket for Bengal, Air India, Railways, Rajasthan, Assam and Delhi. She announced her retirement from all forms of cricket in June 2022.

Career
Rumeli Dhar made her international debut on 27 January 2003, in the 2002–03 World Series of Women's Cricket against England in New Zealand at Bert Sutcliffe Oval, Lincoln. She was part of the India side that reached the final of the 2005 World Cup, and was the side's joint-leading wicket-taker at the 2009 World Twenty20. Having not played an international match since 2012, Dhar made an "unlikely" comeback to the national side in 2018, where she played her final three international matches, two against South Africa and one against Australia.

References

External links 
 
 

1983 births
Living people
Indian women cricket captains
India women Test cricketers
India women One Day International cricketers
India women Twenty20 International cricketers
Air India women cricketers
Assam women cricketers
Bengal women cricketers
Delhi women cricketers
Railways women cricketers
Rajasthan women cricketers
Central Zone women cricketers
Cricketers from Kolkata
Sportswomen from Kolkata